"Hùg Air A' Bhonaid Mhòir" (Celebrate the Big Bonnet) is the second single taken from Julie Fowlis's second album Cuilidh, released the previous year. The cover features a photograph by Louis DeCarlo. The subject of the song is particularly humorous. The song, which is actually made up of two, is a set of Puirt a beul or Mouth Music.

Track listing
"Hùg Air A' Bhonaid Mhòir"

References

2008 singles
Songwriter unknown
Year of song unknown